Baron Hunsdon is a title that has been created three times.

It was first created in 1559 in the Peerage of England for the soldier and courtier Henry Carey. His grandson, the fourth Baron, was created by Viscount Rochford in 1621 and Earl of Dover, in the County of Kent, in 1628. These titles were also in the Peerage of England. He was succeeded by his son, the second Earl. He had already in 1640 been summoned to the House of Lords through a writ of acceleration in his father's barony of Hunsdon. However, on his death in 1677, the viscountcy and earldom became extinct. The barony passed to his second cousin once removed, the sixth Baron. He was the great-grandson of Sir Edmund Carey, the younger son of the first Baron. On his death, the title passed to his first cousin, the seventh Baron. He died unmarried and was succeeded by his first cousin once removed, the eighth Baron. On the latter's death in 1765, the barony became extinct as well.

The second creation was in 1832 in the Peerage of the United Kingdom. Lucius Cary, 10th Viscount Falkland, a peer of Scotland, was created Baron Hunsdon, of Scutterskelfe in the county of York. This title became extinct on his death in 1884.

The title was created again in 1923 in the Peerage of the United Kingdom. The barony was revived for the businessman Herbert Gibbs, who was made Baron Hunsdon of Hunsdon, of Briggens in the County of Hertford. Gibbs was the fourth son of Hucks Gibbs, 1st Baron Aldenham (see the Baron Aldenham for earlier history of the family). He was a partner in the family firm of Antony Gibbs & Sons, and also served as Chairman of the Public Works Loan Board. In 1908, Gibbs acquired Hunsdon House and the Briggens estate in Hertfordshire. He was succeeded by his son, the second Baron. In 1939, he succeeded his cousin to the barony of Aldenham. The two baronies remain united.

Barons Hunsdon, first creation (1559)
Henry Carey, 1st Baron Hunsdon (1526–1596)
George Carey, 2nd Baron Hunsdon (1547–1603)
John Carey, 3rd Baron Hunsdon (c. 1556 – 1617)
Henry Carey, 4th Baron Hunsdon (c. 1580 – 1666, created Viscount Rochford in 1621 and Earl of Dover in 1628)

Viscounts Rochford (1621)
Henry Carey, 1st Viscount Rochford (c. 1580 – 1666, created Earl of Dover in 1628)

Earls of Dover (1628)
Henry Carey, 1st Earl of Dover (c. 1580 – 1666)
John Carey, 2nd Earl of Dover (1608–1677)

At the death of the 2nd Earl, the viscountcy and the earldom became extinct.

Barons Hunsdon, first creation (1559; reverted)
Robert Carey, 6th Baron Hunsdon (b. 1652 – 1692)
Robert Carey, 7th Baron Hunsdon (b. 1649 – 1702)
William Ferdinand Carey, 8th Baron Hunsdon (1684–1765)

At the death of the 8th Baron, the barony became extinct.

Male-line family tree

Baron Hunsdon, second creation (1832)
Lucius Bentinck Cary, 10th Viscount Falkland (1803–1884)

Barons Hunsdon, third creation (1923)
Herbert Cokayne Gibbs, 1st Baron Hunsdon (1854–1935)
Walter Durant Gibbs, 2nd Baron Hunsdon (1888–1969, succeeded as Baron Aldenham in 1939)

See also
 Baron Wraxall

References

Kidd, Charles, Williamson, David (editors). Debrett's Peerage and Baronetage (1990 edition). New York: St Martin's Press, 1990.

 
1559 establishments in England
Noble titles created in 1559
1765 disestablishments in England
Extinct baronies in the Peerage of England
Noble titles created in 1832
1884 disestablishments in the United Kingdom
Extinct baronies in the Peerage of the United Kingdom
Baronies in the Peerage of the United Kingdom
Noble titles created in 1923
 Hunsdon